The Catholic Church in Albania is composed of:
 two Roman Catholic ecclesiastical provinces, comprising two metropolitan archdioceses and three suffragan dioceses
 one pre-diocesan jurisdiction of the Albanian Greek Catholic Church, a particular church sui iuris using the Byzantine Rite Albanian language, comprising only a single Apostolic administration.

Current Catholic dioceses

Actual Latin Catholic sees

Latin Ecclesiastical province of Tiranë-Durrës

Latin Ecclesiastical province of Shkodër–Pult

Albanian Greek Catholic Church

Defunct Latin jurisdictions

Titular Latin Catholic sees 

 One Metropolitan Titular archbishopric: Achrida
 Titular bishoprics : Amantia (Amanzia), Apollonia, Aulon, Balecium (Balecio / Balezo), Benda, Buthrotum (Butrinto), Craina, Croæ, Drivastum (Drivasto / Drisht), Glavinitza, Hadrianopolis in Epiro, Lestrona, Onchesmus (Onchesmo), Pulcheriopolis, Sarda, Scampa, Stephaniacum (Stefaniaco)

Other defunct Latin jurisdictions 
 Territorial Abbacy of Shën Llezhri i Oroshit, merged into Roman Catholic Diocese of Rrëshen

Several (arch)bishoprics had their title integrated into the merger:
 Roman Catholic Archdiocese of Durrës (Durazzo), merged into Roman Catholic Archdiocese of Tiranë–Durrës
 Roman Catholic Diocese of Pulati, merged into Roman Catholic Archdiocese of Shkodër-Pult
 Roman Catholic Diocese of Shkodër (Shkodrë), merged into Roman Catholic Archdiocese of Shkodër–Pult

See also 
 List of Catholic dioceses (structured view)

Sources and external links 
 GCatholic.org.
 Catholic-Hierarchy

Albania
Albania religion-related lists